Culex tarsalis, also known as Western Encephalitis Mosquito, is a mosquito species that appears in southern California.  The species has black and white banding on the legs. 

The species is a major vector of Saint Louis encephalitis and Western equine encephalitis virus in the western USA. It is also a confirmed vector of West Nile virus.

References

tarsalis
Insects of the United States
Insects described in 1896
Taxa named by Daniel William Coquillett